Ditaxis is a plant genus of the family Euphorbiaceae first described as a genus in 1824. Its name comes from Greek dis ("two") and taxis ("rank"), referring to the stamens which are in two whorls. The genus is widespread across much of the Western Hemisphere from the southern United States to Uruguay.

Species

formerly included
moved to other genera (Adelia Argythamnia Caperonia Chiropetalum Philyra)

References

External links
Jepson Manual Treatment

Chrozophoreae
Euphorbiaceae genera